Saint Kitts and Nevis competed at the 2019 World Aquatics Championships in Gwangju, South Korea from 12 to 28 July.

Swimming

Saint Kitts and Nevis entered one swimmer.

Women

References

Nations at the 2019 World Aquatics Championships
Swimming in Saint Kitts and Nevis
2019 in Saint Kitts and Nevis